Serpico are a punk/metal band from Edinburgh, Scotland. They released their debut album, Neon Wasteland, on 25 May 2009 on WeSaySo Records. A music video for the first single "We Own The Night" was shot at Malvern Hills UK on 14 March 2009. The single was then released on 27 April 2009.

Discography
 Serpico EP (2007)
 Neon Wasteland (WeSaySo, 2009)
 "We Can Rebuild" (2013)

References

Scottish rock music groups
Scottish heavy metal musical groups
Equal Vision Records artists